The US Embassy in Asmara is diplomatic mission of the United States to Eritrea.

Leadership

Ambassador is in charge of the Embassy. Steven C. Walker is the current chargé_d'affaires.

History
The United States established the embassy on June 11, 1991. The Consulate in Asmara became an Embassy with Joseph P. O'Neill as Chargé d'Affaires ad interim.

See also

List of diplomatic missions of the United States
Eritrea–United States relations

References

Official website

 Official website

Eritrea
United States
Eritrea–United States relations